Panchkalshi or SKP is a Hindu community. They are one of the original native communities of Bombay (Mumbai) metropolitan area in the Konkan division of India. Since the 19th century the community has called itself Somvanshi Kshatriya Pathare.

History
They are a people who migrated to Bombay (Mumbai) in 13th century AD along with Yaduvanshi king, Raja Bhimdev. According to tradition, the Panchkalshis derive their name from the fact that their former headman used to sit on a canopied throne surmounted by five kalashas. A census from 1780 of Mahim and Bombay fort showed SKP community to be 8% and 4% of the population of these two localities respectively. During the Portuguese colonisation of Bombay, Bassein& Taana; many Hindus including some Panchkalshi adopted Christianity. A number of them were converted back to Hinduism in Maharashtra after the Peshva Brahmins led the Mahratta invasion of Taana, Bassein & Colaaba.
In the British Bombay era, the community took to carpentry, contract work & architecture.
Pqnchkalshis consider themselves one notch above the Chaukalshis.
This community was one of first communities to advocate widow re-marriage.

Culture
Even though being a small community and having been exposed to western culture due to centuries of European rule of the place, people from the SKP community celebrate their festivals so as to pass down their traditions to the next generation. Exceptions to certain celebration like the high caste Hindu sacred thread ceremony "Munja Ceremony", which was abolished in the early 20th centuries by the leaders of the society, because as such it is unnecessary expense and was not relevant in this day and age. So a lot of educated families at that time stopped the tradition of "Munja Ceremony". Also, widow remarriage was accepted. 

Pachkalshi have founded at least three Hindu temples in Mumbai like Malkeshwar temple in Parel and also Mahadev temple named after famous Parli Vaijnath temple is said to have been built by them. Another temple built by them is of their Kuldevi Vajreshwari devi. The community celebrates a unique festival.On Pithori Amavasya,(last date in Lunar Shaka month of Shravan) the women in the family pray to 64 yoginis for the well-being of the children.The women make offerings to figurines of the 64 deities made of flour.The eldest woman in the family holds the figurines on her head and the children surround her.It signifies that the deities will keep a watch on the children.

The community is often confused with the Pathare Prabhus because during the British era both communities were recorded as the same in the census.Although the culture of both communities may be similar, the two are in fact separate communities.

Surnames
Being natives of Mumbai, many families in the community use surnames derived by adding the suffix -kar to names of the old Mumbai villages (now suburbs) such as Borivali, Malad, Goregaon, Bhayandar, Thane, Chembur, Dadar, Mahim, Parel, virar, Juhu and Worli.

The Other famous surnames are Mhatre,Sawtale,Purav,Pathare,Naik ,Darvalikar, Mantri .

Notables
Gangaji Naik was a prominent Maratha warrior and sardar of the 18th century. He was the prime ally of Chimaji Appasaheb Peshwa during the battle of Vasai during 1737-38.
Dr Sakharam Arjun (1839-1885) - Physician and a founding member of the Bombay Natural History Society. Step-father of the pioneering woman physician Rukhmabai
Dr Rukhmabai (1864-1955) - One of the first Indian lbook
doctors.

4. Sanjay Raut, Member of Parliament (India) and Shivsena leader.

5. Prakash Harischandra, Author of Chimaji Appasaheb Peshwa: The Slayer of Portuguese Regime book 

6. Pandhari Juker, Veteran Bollywood Make-up Artist.

References

Indian castes
Marathi people
Maharashtra

External links

Panchkalshi